Gordon Alan Gebert Jr. (born October 17, 1941) is an American former child actor, architect, and professor predominantly known for playing Janet Leigh's son in Holiday Affair and for smaller roles. In adulthood, he trained as an architect and has taught at The City College of New York.

Biography
Gebert was born in Des Moines, Iowa in 1941 to Gordon and Violette Gebert. His father was a salesman for a trailer company and sold truck and bus fleets for Ford Motor Company in Iowa. In 1948, Gebert, aged seven, moved with his family to Van Nuys, California. In 1949 Gebert was cast as WWII widow Janet Leigh's son in the movie Holiday Affair. Thereafter, he appeared in nine full-length feature films, including the highly regarded films noir The Narrow Margin and The House on Telegraph Hill, and two shorts released between 1950 and 1970, always playing the role of a son.  

Gebert also performed in minor roles in 15 episodes of various television series, including The Donna Reed Show (one episode, 1959), and Bachelor Father (one episode, 1960). Gebert's final performance was in a Christian youth scare film.

After graduating from Van Nuys High School, Gebert enrolled at University of California, Los Angeles before transferring to the University of Southern California. He earned a bachelor's degree in architecture at age 25 from MIT's Department of Architecture in 1966 and a master's degree from Princeton University in 1968.

Since 1971, he has been a professor at New York's City College Spitzer School of Architecture, where he was Acting Dean of Architecture from 2015 to 2019. Gebert has been licensed to practice architecture in New York State since 1973.

Personal life 
Gebert married Phyllis A. DeReamer of Greenfield, Massachusetts in 1973; they later divorced. The couple had two daughters, Carrie Gebert-Kaplan and D'Arcy Gebert.

In 1988, Gebert married Lizabeth Paravisini-Gebert, a professor of Hispanic Studies at Vassar College. They reside in Manhattan, New York. Their son, Gordon Alan Gebert III, is a graduate of Oakwood Friends School in Hudson Valley.

Filmography
 Holiday Affair (1949) ... Timmy
 The Flame and the Arrow (1950) ... Rudi Bartoli
 Saddle Tramp (1950) ... Johnnie
 Chicago Calling (1951) ... Bobby
 The House on Telegraph Hill (1951) ... Christopher
 Night Into Morning (1951) ... Russ Kirby
 Flying Leathernecks (1951) ... Tommy Kirby
 The Narrow Margin (1952) ... Tommy Sinclair
 To Hell and Back (1955) ... Audie as a boy
 Summer Love (1971) ... Tad Powers

Publications
Gebert, G. A. (1966). Thesis: A continuing education conference center for Massachusetts Institute of Technology. 
Gebert, G. A. (1985), Urban and Regional Information Systems Association. Academy of Local Government Information Sciences., & Local Government Computer Services Board of Ireland. Local government and information technology: Papers and reports from the International workshop held at Ennis, Co. Clare, Ireland, April 24–27, 1984. Oxford: Pergamon Press.
Gebert, G. A. (1985). "Application development approaches in a MUMPS environment". Journal of Medical Systems, 9, 3, 155–162. 
Gebert, G. A. (1986), Editorial: Software survey section. Computers, Environment and Urban Systems, 11, 3.

References

External links

1941 births
Living people
American male child actors
Architecture educators
MIT School of Architecture and Planning alumni
City University of New York faculty
Princeton University School of Architecture alumni
University of California, Los Angeles alumni
USC School of Architecture alumni